Hallew is a hamlet in the parish of Treverbyn (where the 2011 census population was included ), Cornwall, England.

References

Hamlets in Cornwall